Henry Prior (20 December 1898 – 24 May 1989) was a South African cricketer. He played in two first-class matches for Border in 1928/29.

See also
 List of Border representative cricketers

References

External links
 

1898 births
1989 deaths
South African cricketers
Border cricketers
Cricketers from East London, Eastern Cape